Persona 2, also marketed as Shin Megami Tensei: Persona 2, is a duology of role-playing video games developed and published by Atlus for the PlayStation. It is formed by the second and third installments of the Persona series, which is a spin-off of the Megami Tensei franchise:

 Persona 2: Innocent Sin (1999)
 Persona 2: Eternal Punishment (2000)

See also
 Persona 3 The Movie: No. 2, Midsummer Knight's Dream, a 2014 Japanese anime film and the second installment in a film series based on the Persona 3 video game by Atlus
 Persona Q2: New Cinema Labyrinth, a 2018 role-playing video game developed and published by Atlus for the Nintendo 3DS

Persona (series)
Duologies
Shueisha manga
Shueisha franchises